Cape to Cairo may refer to:
 Cape to Cairo Railway
 Cape to Cairo Red Line, the 19th century concept of a British-dominated Africa, promoted by Cecil Rhodes
 Cape to Cairo Road

See also 
 Dark Star Safari: Overland from Cairo to Cape Town, a book by Paul Theroux
 The Rhodes Colossus